Kanki can refer to the following:

 Kanki, Uttar Dinajpur, an Indian town
 Kanki, Purulia, a census town in West Bengal, India

People with the surname
 Hiromitsu Kanki, Japanese shogi player
, Japanese musician

Japanese-language surnames